William Middleton was an English professional footballer who made over 280 appearances as a forward in the Scottish League for Ayr United, Aberdeen and Dumbarton. He also played in the Football League for Southend United.

Personal life 
Middleton served as a private in the Football Battalion of the Middlesex Regiment during the First World War.

Career statistics

References

1893 births
Date of death missing
People from Hetton-le-Hole
Footballers from Tyne and Wear
English footballers
Association football forwards
Boldon Community Association F.C. players
Newcastle City F.C. players
Birmingham City F.C. players
Crystal Palace F.C. players
Folkestone F.C. players
Ayr United F.C. players
Aberdeen F.C. players
Southend United F.C. players
Brighton & Hove Albion F.C. players
Dumbarton F.C. players
Scottish Football League players
English Football League players
Date of birth unknown
British Army personnel of World War I
Middlesex Regiment soldiers
Year of death missing
Date of death unknown
Place of death unknown